Robert John Hill (born 1 February 1954) is a New Zealand former cricketer. He played nine first-class and five List A matches for Otago between 1976 and 1990.

Hill played most of his senior cricket for Southland, becoming the first player to play 100 two- or three-day games for Southland, and taking part in 36 challenge matches for the Hawke Cup between 1974 and 1992. He later had senior coaching roles in Southland cricket for more than 20 years.

See also
 List of Otago representative cricketers

References

External links
 

1954 births
Living people
New Zealand cricketers
New Zealand cricket coaches
Otago cricketers
People from Gore, New Zealand